Sinan Uzun (born 25 January 1990 in Sinop) is a Turkish professional footballer who currently plays as a forward for Zonguldak Kömürspor.

He wears 57 number of his birth city, Sinop's traffical code.

References

External links
TFF.org profile

1990 births
Living people
People from Sinop, Turkey
Turkish footballers
Balıkesirspor footballers
Association football forwards